Debbie Travis' Facelift was a home improvement reality television show that ran from January 28, 2003 to December 30, 2005. It was produced in Canada for Home & Garden Television (HGTV) and also aired in the United States on the American version of the network, Home & Garden Television. It is hosted by interior designer Debbie Travis, and was based out of Montreal, Quebec.

The show's format is that of a surprise renovation; a family member or loved one contacts the show to arrange a 'facelift' of a part of the home for the unsuspecting target(s). By taking advantage of the target's absence (or arranging a pretense for it), the 'Facelift team' moves in for the duration to renovate as quickly as possible. Much of the show's drama is based around time and budget constraints in completing the job before the target returns, and upon the reaction of the target once they see the completed work.

The personalities of members of the team have become well known to regular viewers, along with such trademarks as the "Sivart van" (an old-style delivery truck labeled sivart, 'Travis' spelled in reverse), which the team arrives in; Debbie's reveal of a possibly-controversial design to skeptical family members; and the 'facelift book', a small scrapbook presented to the target after the renovation is revealed, showing what they missed during their absence.

Some 'twists' that have occurred on various episodes include the target returning early, unexpectedly; vital materials not arriving on time, forcing the team to improvise; and dissatisfied targets demanding a change to the renovation scheme.

Episodes

Season 1

Season 2

Season 3

Season 4

External links
Official site
Debbie Travis' official site

2000s Canadian reality television series
HGTV (Canada) original programming
2003 Canadian television series debuts
2005 Canadian television series endings